In the United Kingdom's 2017 general election, 650 Members of Parliament (MPs) were elected to the House of Commons – one for each parliamentary constituency. A record number of women (208) were elected as MPs.

Parliament consists of the House of Lords and the elected House of Commons. The State Opening of Parliament at the Palace of Westminster by  Queen Elizabeth II was on 21 June 2017. The subsequent parliamentary session was the longest since the formation of the United Kingdom in 1707, and the longest to sit at Westminster since the Long Parliament in the 17th century. The second and last parliamentary session however was the shortest since October 1948, lasting less than a month, from 14 October 2019 until Parliament dissolved at 00:01 on 6 November 2019.

Notable newcomers to enter the House of Commons in this General Election included future Secretary of State for Scotland Alister Jack and future Scottish Conservative leader Douglas Ross. For the opposition, newcomers included Shadow Chancellor of the Exchequer Anneliese Dodds and future Shadow Secretary of State for Women and Equalities Marsha de Cordova.

The Parliament was marked by extraordinary political turmoil as Governments led by Theresa May and Boris Johnson were unable to win a series of important votes on the issue of Brexit. This left both Parliament and the Government in a prolonged state of deadlock and unable to move forward on the issue. Consequently, there was an unusually high number of defections and suspensions, including the suspension of 21 Conservative MPs in September 2019; 10 of those suspended MPs re-joined the Conservative Party in October 2019. The Parliament was dissolved after MPs passed the Early Parliamentary General Election Act 2019, which bypassed the Fixed-term Parliaments Act 2011 to bring the next election forward to December 2019 from its original scheduled May 2022 date.

House of Commons composition
Below are graphical representations of the House of Commons showing party strengths directly after the 2017 general election, at important intermediate points, and immediately prior to dissolution. This is not an actual seating plan of the House, which has only five rows of benches on each side, with the government party to the right of the Speaker of the House of Commons and opposition parties to the left, but with room for only around two-thirds of MPs to sit at any one time. 

This table shows the number of MPs in each party:

Notes
For full details of changes during this Parliament, see Defections and suspensions and By-elections.
Labour, as the largest party not in government, took the role of Official Opposition (OO). The Co-operative Party was represented in the House of Commons by Labour MPs sitting with the Labour and Co-operative designation.
"Members elected" refers to the composition resulting from the election on 8 June 2017, but note that the confidence and supply arrangement (C&S) was only reached on 26 June.
The "voting total" is the effective size of the House excluding vacancies, suspensions, and certain members (ten at dissolution): the Speaker, two (usually three) Deputy Speakers (one Labour and one Conservative) who had only a tie-breaking vote constrained by conventions, and seven abstentionist members (Sinn Féin). This left relevant party voting totals as follows: Con 297, Lab 241, SF 0, Speaker 0.
The "safe majority" (the number of seats needed to have a majority of one or two), "Gov short by" (the margin by which the governing Conservatives are short of that majority), and "Gov + C&S total" are based on the voting totals. The government entered into a confidence and supply agreement to secure a small majority, which shrank due to defections, finally disappearing on 3 September 2019. Hence, the "Gov + C&S majority", calculated as the sum of voting Conservative and Democratic Unionist Party members, less the sum of all other voting members, was negative at dissolution.

List of MPs elected in the general election
The following table is a list of MPs elected, ordered by constituency. Names of incumbents are listed where they stood for re-election; for details of other defeated candidates and the incumbent who stood down in those cases see individual constituency articles.

Notes

Deputy Speakers
The Speaker nominated Sir David Amess (Conservative, Southend West) and George Howarth (Labour, Knowsley) to serve as Temporary Deputy Speakers until the Deputy Speakers had been elected. The election of Deputy Speakers took place on 28 June 2017.

Although Deputy Speakers do not resign from their parties, they cease to vote (except to break ties) and they do not participate in party-political activity until the next election.

As the only contesting member from the government side, Eleanor Laing's name did not appear on the ballot paper, and she was duly declared First Deputy Chairman of Ways and Means.

When Sir Lindsay Hoyle was elected Speaker on 4 November 2019 in succession to John Bercow, the post of Chairman of Ways and Means (one of the Deputy Speakers) became vacant and remained so when Parliament was dissolved on 6 November.

By-elections

By-elections are held for seats that become vacant.

John Mann vacated the seat for Bassetlaw on 28 October 2019, and the Speaker John Bercow vacated his Buckingham seat on 4 November 2019. The seats remained vacant until dissolution and the election of new MPs in the general election on 12 December 2019.

Defections and suspensions
The label under which MPs sit in the House of Commons can change if they leave or are suspended from or expelled by their party. When suspended, they effectively become independents. This Parliament has had an unusually large number of these changes, resulting in the number of MPs sitting as independents rising to its highest level (33) since the Ballot Act 1872 (which introduced secret ballots for elections in the United Kingdom).

The Conservative and Labour parties lost numerous MPs through suspensions and defections to other parties. In February 2019, 8 Labour and 3 Conservative MPs formed a new grouping (later a party in its own right), Change UK. That grouping experienced a split in June, with some of its members resigning to form The Independents. The Liberal Democrats have made a gain of 8 seats since the opening of Parliament, including some former Change UK members. The government lost its majority on 3 September 2019, when the Conservative MP Phillip Lee defected to the Liberal Democrats. Later the same day, the Conservatives expelled 21 of their MPs for voting against the government, 10 of whom were later readmitted to the party on 29 October.

Progression of government majority and party totals 
The majority is calculated as above.

See also
Members of the House of Lords
List of United Kingdom MPs by seniority (2017–2019)

Notes and references

UK MPs
2017 United Kingdom general election
2017
 
2017 establishments in the United Kingdom